Hawke is a surname. Notable people with the surname include:

Albert Hawke (1900–1986), Premier of Western Australia
Alex Hawke (b. 1977), Australian politician
Bob Hawke (1929–2019), Prime Minister of Australia
Brett Hawke (b. 1975), Australian Olympic swimmer
Clem Hawke (1898–1989), Congregationalist minister and father of Bob Hawke
Davis Wolfgang Hawke (1978–2017), U.S. spammer
Edward Hawke, 1st Baron Hawke (1705–1781), British naval officer
Ethan Hawke (b. 1970), American actor
George Hawke (1871–1950), New Zealand cricketer
Hazel Hawke (1929–2013), wife of Bob Hawke
Joe Hawke (b. 1940), New Zealand politician
John D. Hawke, Jr. (b. 1933), U.S. comptroller of the currency
Johnny Hawke (1925–1992), Australian rugby league footballer
Martin Hawke, 7th Baron Hawke (1860–1938), known as Lord Hawke, English cricketer
Maya Hawke (b. 1998), American actress and model
Neil Hawke (1939–2000), Australian cricketer and footballer
Paul Hawke (b. 1964), Australian rules footballer
Simon Hawke (b. 1951), science fiction author
Warren Hawke (b. 1970), English professional footballer

Fictional characters
Connor Hawke, son of Green Arrow from DC Comics
Ian Hawke the main antagonist in the live action-CGI films starring Alvin and the Chipmunks
Meyrin Hawke and Lunamaria Hawke, fictional characters from anime series Mobile Suit Gundam Seed Destiny
Saint John Hawke, fictional character in season 4 of the American television series Airwolf
Stringfellow Hawke, fictional character from seasons 1-3 of Airwolf
 Elizabeth Hawke, protagonist/antagonist in the Australian series Wicked Science
 Hawke, the surname of the player character of Dragon Age II

English-language surnames